Dudley bus station is a bus station in Dudley, England. It is managed by Transport for West Midlands. Local bus and national coach services operated by various companies serve the bus station which has 19 departure stands.

The arrival stand is A and also on surrounding streets and the departures stands are lettered B - U (excluding I and O). U is allocated to long distance coach services, which are mainly pre-booked.

The original bus station was constructed along Birmingham Street on a steep hill overlooking Dudley Castle in about 1950. It was complemented by an additional line of shelters along neighbouring Fisher Street. However, a series on incidents of buses rolling back injuring passengers led to widespread local criticism of its design. This resulted in the West Midlands Passenger Transport Executive rebuilding the bus station on a completely level site along Fisher Street. Construction of the new bus station began during 1985 and it was opened in 1986.

The original lay-over facilities on adjacent Portersfield still remain to this day, on part of what is now a public car park. As at September 2022, the 19 stands were served by 22 routes.

The bus station is due to be redeveloped to create an interchange with the under construction West Midlands Metro line to Brierley Hill. Planning permission was granted in September 2022.

Bus routes

Former bus routes

References

Buildings and structures in Dudley
Bus stations in the West Midlands (county)
Transport in Dudley
Transport infrastructure completed in 1986
1986 establishments in England